The 2018 Woking Borough Council election took place on 3 May 2018 to elect one third of members to Woking Borough Council in England coinciding with other local elections held across much of England. Elections in each ward are held in three years out of four.

Woking was one of the boroughs subject to a trial of voter ID requiring the production of photographic ID or 2 other forms of ID at the polling station.

Results
The Conservatives lost one seat to the Liberal Democrats, with Mount Hermon councillor Mark Pengelly losing by a margin of just 17 votes to  Liam Lyons, who had been defeated by Pengelly two years earlier. The Conservatives also failed to win their target seats of Byfleet and St John's by narrow margins, and came within 10 votes of losing in Goldsworth Park, although they held their seats in Horsell, Knaphill, Heathlands and Pyrford with very large majorities.

The result meant that the Tory majority over all other parties on the council reduced from four to two, so the Conservatives still maintained overall control as they have done since 2007, counting a short period of minority administration. Despite polling 3.2% in the all-out council elections in 2016, the Green Party did not field candidates.

|- style="background-color:#F6F6F6"
! colspan="8" style="text-align: right; margin-right: 0.5em" | Turnout
| style="text-align: right; margin-right: 0.5em" | 27,884
| style="text-align: right; margin-right: 0.5em" | 
| style="text-align: right; margin-right: 0.5em" | —
|-

Ward by ward
Successful incumbents are marked with a green tick: , defeated incumbents with a red cross:

References

2018 English local elections
2018
2010s in Surrey